Shidong may refer to the following places in China:

 Shidong Subdistrict, subdistrict of Longmatan District, Luzhou, Sichuan
Shidong, Huaiji County, a town in Guangdong
 Shidong, Gaolan County, a town in Gansu